The 1987–88 Allsvenskan was the 54th season of the top division of Swedish handball. 12 teams competed in the league. Redbergslids IK won the regular season but HK Drott won the playoffs and claimed their fifth Swedish title. HP Warta and Västra Frölunda IF were relegated.

League table

Playoffs

Semifinals 
 Redbergslids IK–Ystads IF 26–20, 21–12 (Redbergslids IK won series 2–0)
 HK Drott–HK Cliff 22–21, 22–14 (HK Drott won series 2–0)

Finals 
 HK Drott–Redbergslids IK 22–19, 25–24 (p), 13–12 (HK Drott won series 3–0)

References 

Swedish handball competitions